Wolfgang Ewald (26 March 1911 – 24 February 1995) was a Luftwaffe ace and recipient of the Knight's Cross of the Iron Cross during World War II.  The Knight's Cross of the Iron Cross was awarded to recognise extreme battlefield bravery or successful military leadership.

Career

On 18 August 1940, known as The Hardest Day, twelve Messerschmitt Bf 109s from 2. Staffel of Jagdgeschwader 52 (JG 52—52nd Fighter Wing), led by Ewald, attacked RAF fighters out in the open at RAF Manston. After two passes, the Germans claimed ten fighters and three Bristol Blenheim bombers destroyed. In fact, just two No. 266 Squadron Supermarine Spitfire fighters were destroyed with another six Hawker Hurricane fighters damaged but repairable. A single Hurricane was also destroyed.

On 23 July 1942, Ewald was given command as Gruppenkommandeur (group commander) of III. Gruppe of Jagdgeschwader 3 "Udet" (JG 3—3rd Fighter Wing). He replaced Major Karl-Heinz Greisert who was killed in action the day before. Ewald was awarded the Knight's Cross of the Iron Cross on 9 December 1942.

He was temporarily replaced by Hauptmann Leo Eggers and Hauptmann Karl-Heinz Langer before command of III. Gruppe was officially given to Hauptmann Walther Dahl on 20 July. Ewald was taken prisoner of war and was held until 1949.

Summary of career

Aerial victory claims
According to Spick, Ewald was credited with 78 aerial victories claimed in an unknown number combat missions. This figure includes one aerial victory during the Spanish Civil War, two during the Battle of France and Britain and further 75 aerial victories on the Eastern Front. Mathews and Foreman, authors of Luftwaffe Aces — Biographies and Victory Claims, researched the German Federal Archives and found documentation for 65 aerial victory claims, plus two further unconfirmed claims. This number includes one claim during the Spanish Civil War, one over the Western Allies, and 63 on the Eastern Front.

Awards
 Aviator badge
 Spanish Cross in Gold with Swords (14 April 1939)
 Front Flying Clasp of the Luftwaffe
 Iron Cross (1939) 2nd and 1st Class
 Honour Goblet of the Luftwaffe on 21 September 1942 as Hauptmann and Gruppenkommandeur
 German Cross in Gold on 3 October 1942 as Hauptmann in the III./Jagdgeschwader 3
 Knight's Cross of the Iron Cross on 9 December 1942 as Major and Gruppenkommandeur of the III./Jagdgeschwader 3 "Udet"

References

Citations

Bibliography

External links
 Luftwaffe 1939–1945 History
 TracesOfWar.com

1911 births
1995 deaths
Condor Legion personnel
German Air Force personnel
German military personnel of the Spanish Civil War
German prisoners of war in World War II held by the Soviet Union
German World War II flying aces
Luftwaffe pilots
Military personnel from Hamburg
Recipients of the Gold German Cross
Recipients of the Knight's Cross of the Iron Cross
Shot-down aviators